The Oregon State Beavers softball team represents Oregon State University in NCAA Division I college softball.  The team participates in the Pac-12 Conference. The Beavers are currently led by head coach Laura Berg. The team plays their home games at Kelly Field, formerly known as Oregon State Softball Complex, located on the university's campus.

History

Coaching history

Championships

Conference Championships

Coaching staff

Notable players

Conference awards
Pac-12 Pitcher of the Year
Brianne McGowan (2005)

Pac-12 Coach of the Year
Kirk Walker (1999, 2005)

References